Le filmeur is a 2005 French drama film directed by Alain Cavalier. It was screened in the Un Certain Regard section at the 2005 Cannes Film Festival.

Cast
 Christian Boltanski - Himself
 Danielle Bouilhet - Herself
 Camille de Casabianca - Herself (archive footage)
 Alain Cavalier - Himself
 Bernard Crombey - Himself
 Philippe Daveney - Himself
 Caroline Laval - Herself
 Thérèse Martin - Herself
 Alexandre Widhoff - Himself
 Françoise Widhoff - Herself

References

External links

2005 films
2000s French-language films
2005 drama films
Films directed by Alain Cavalier
French drama films
Films produced by Michel Seydoux
2000s French films